Im Jung-eun (born March 31, 1981) is a South Korean actress. She is best known for her roles in Unsolved (also known as Secret Investigation Record) and Man from the Equator.

Television series

{| class="wikitable sortable" 
|-
! Year 
! Title
! Role
! Network
! class="unsortable" | Notes
! class="unsortable" |Ref.
|- 
|2005
|Lawyers
|Kim Se Hee
|MBC
|||
|-
|2006
|Cloud Stairs 
|Oh Yoon-hee
|KBS2
|||
|-
|2007
|Ground Zero
|
|MBC
|||
|-
|2008
|Aquarius
|
|SBS
|||
|-
|2008
|The Kingdom of the Winds 
|Princess Seryu
|KBS2||||
|-
|2009
|Swallow the Sun 
|Ahn Mi-yeon
|SBS||||
|-
|2010
|Joseon X-Files
|Heo Yoon-yi
|tvN||||
|-
|2011
|When Women Powder Twice
|Suzy Hamilton
|JTBC||||
|-
|2012
|Man from the Equator
|Choi Soo-mi
|KBS2||||
|-
|2012
|KBS Drama Special "Glass Prison"
|Soo-jeong
|KBS2
|Season 3 Episode 10
|
|-
|2013
|Ruby Ring|Jung Runa/Jung Ruby
|KBS2||||
|-
|2019
|Babel 
|Na Yeong-eun
|TV Chosun||||
|-
|2020
|Once Again ||Sung Hyun-kyung ||KBS ||||
|-
|}

Films
 Rainbow Goddess (2020)
 My Little Brother (2016)Tone-deaf Clinic aka Love Clinique (2012)My Love (2007)Shadows in the Palace (2007)Tazza: The High Rollers (2006)Cinderella (2006)Fly High (2006)Same Pillow, Different Dream (2005)Make It Big (2002)

Variety showsFun TV Rollercoaster "Hongdae 정태" (tvN, 2011)Sunday Sunday Night: Hot Brothers (MBC, 2010)Sunday Sunday Night (MBC, 2009)Ya Shim Man Man: Entertainment Village (SBS, 2009)

Music videosBe With You (The SeeYa, 2012)

Awards
2012 Korean Culture and Entertainment Awards: Best Supporting Actress (Tone-deaf Clinic)
2008 SBS Drama Awards: New Star Award (Aquarius'')

References

External links
 
 
 
 
 

People from Busan
South Korean film actresses
Living people
1981 births
South Korean television actresses